Events from the year 1940 in Canada.

Incumbents

Crown 
 Monarch – George VI

Federal government 
 Governor General – John Buchan, Lord Tweedsmuir (until February 11) then Alexander Cambridge, 1st Earl of Athlone (from June 21)
 Prime Minister – William Lyon Mackenzie King
 Chief Justice – Lyman Poore Duff (British Columbia)
 Parliament – 18th (until 25 January) then 19th (from 16 May)

Provincial governments

Lieutenant governors 
Lieutenant Governor of Alberta – John C. Bowen   
Lieutenant Governor of British Columbia – Eric Hamber
Lieutenant Governor of Manitoba – William Johnston Tupper(until November 1) then Roland Fairbairn McWilliams  
Lieutenant Governor of New Brunswick – Murray MacLaren (until March 5) then William George Clark  
Lieutenant Governor of Nova Scotia – Robert Irwin (until May 31) then Frederick Francis Mathers  
Lieutenant Governor of Ontario – Albert Edward Matthews 
Lieutenant Governor of Prince Edward Island – Bradford William LePage 
Lieutenant Governor of Quebec – Eugène Fiset 
Lieutenant Governor of Saskatchewan – Archibald Peter McNab

Premiers 
Premier of Alberta – William Aberhart    
Premier of British Columbia – Thomas Dufferin Pattullo 
Premier of Manitoba – John Bracken 
Premier of New Brunswick – Allison Dysart (until March 13) then John McNair 
Premier of Nova Scotia – Angus Lewis Macdonald (until July 10) then A.S. MacMillan
Premier of Ontario – Mitchell Hepburn 
Premier of Prince Edward Island – Thane Campbell  
Premier of Quebec – Adélard Godbout 
Premier of Saskatchewan – William John Patterson

Territorial governments

Commissioners 
 Controller of Yukon – George A. Jeckell 
 Commissioner of Northwest Territories – Charles Camsell

Events

January to June
March 13 – John McNair becomes premier of New Brunswick, replacing Allison Dysart
March 21 – Alberta election: William Aberhart's Social Credit Party wins a second consecutive majority
March 26 – Federal election: Mackenzie King's Liberals win a second consecutive majority
April 3 – Alexander Cambridge, 1st Earl of Athlone is appointed Governor General of Canada replacing the late John Buchan, 1st Baron Tweedsmuir
April 25 – Quebec women get the vote in provincial elections
May 28–June 30 – World War II: The Canadian navy stations seven destroyers in the English Channel; these play an important role in evacuating Allied troops from France
June – World War II: Canadian troops are some of a small number of forces defending Britain
June 5 – Nazi, fascist, and communist groups are declared illegal in Canada and leaders and members are jailed
June 10 – World War II: Canada declares war against Italy
June 13–18 – World War II: A small number of Canadian troops land in Brest, France but are forced to evacuate soon after
June 21 – The National Resources Mobilization Act is passed; conscription is introduced, but only for homeland defence
June 25 –  sinks in a collision in the Gironde estuary in France. 45 sailors die.

July to December 

 July 10: Alexander MacMillan becomes premier of Nova Scotia, replacing Angus Macdonald
 August 1 – September 17: World War II: 80 Canadian pilots participate in the Battle of Britain
 August 5: Camillien Houde, the mayor of Montreal is arrested for sedition due to his anti-conscription rhetoric
 August 7: Unemployment insurance is introduced
 August 13: The Canadian Armoured Corps is established
 August 18: The Odgensburg Agreement on continental defence is signed with the United States
 September 5: United Kingdom trades most of its North American military bases to the United States in exchange for 50 destroyers
 October 22:  is sunk in a collision in the North Atlantic. 142 sailors die and 34 survive.
 November 7: The Permanent Active Militia is renamed the Canadian Army (Active) and the Non-Permanent Active Militia is renamed the Canadian Army (Reserve).

Full date unknown
The Icefields Parkway in the Canadian Rockies is completed.
The Rowell-Sirois Commission report on federal-provincial relations is released
Wilbur Franks invents the g-suit at the University of Toronto

Arts and literature

New Works
Morley Callaghan – Just ask George

Awards
See the 1940 Governor General's Awards for a complete list of winners and finalists for those awards.

Sport 
April 13 – The New York Rangers win their third Stanley Cup (and last until 1994) by defeating the Toronto Maple Leafs 4 games to 2. The deciding Game 6 was played at the Maple Leaf Gardens in Toronto
April 22 – The Ontario Hockey Association's Oshawa Generals win their second (consecutive) Memorial Cup by defeating Manitoba Junior Hockey League's Kenora Thistles 3 games to 1. The deciding Game 4 was played at Shea's Amphitheatre in Winnipeg 
November 30 – The Ottawa Rough Riders win their second Grey Cup by defeating the Toronto Balmy Beach Beachers 20 to 7 in the 28th Grey Cup played at Varsity Stadium in Toronto

Births

January to March
January 1 - Clifford Olson, serial killer (d. 2011)
January 10 - Guy Chevrette, politician
January 28 - Valery Fabrikant, professor of mechanical engineering and murderer responsible for the Concordia University massacre on August 24, 1992
February 4 - Michelle Rossignol, Canadian actress
February 16 - Don Bertoia, middle-distance runner
March 4 - Nellie Cournoyea, former politician and 6th Premier of the Northwest Territories and the first female premier of a Canadian territory 
March 6 - Ken Danby, artist (d. 2007)
March 22 - Dave Keon, ice hockey player

April to June

May 4 - Paul Thompson, playwright and theatre director
May 8 - Irwin Cotler, politician and minister
May 10 - Peter Liba, journalist and Lieutenant-Governor of Manitoba (d. 2007)
May 20 - Otto Jelinek, figure skater, businessman and politician
June 14 - Mark Assad, politician
June 21 - Helen Potrebenko, author and activist (d. 2022)
June 25 - Louise Dacquay, politician

July to September

July 4 - Pat Stapleton, ice hockey player (d. 2020)
July 11 - Yvon Charbonneau, politician
July 15 - Glen Findlay, politician
July 22 - Alex Trebek, television personality and game show host (d. 2020)
July 27 - Harvie Andre, engineer, businessman, politician and Minister
July 28 - Mario Sergio, politician
August 7 - Sally McCallum, track and field athlete
September 1 - Edward Roberts, lawyer and politician (d. 2022)
September 6 - Brian Smith, ice hockey player and sportscaster (d. 1995)
September 9 - Larry Lund, ice hockey player
September 11 - Gerry Phillips, politician
September 19
 Sylvia Tyson, singer-songwriter and guitarist 
 Ed Westfall, ice hockey player and sportscaster
September 20 - Doug Young, politician and Minister
September 30
 Harry Jerome, track and field runner (d. 1982)
 Dewey Martin, rock drummer (d. 2009)

October to December
October 11 - David McFadden, poet, fiction writer and travel writer
October 19 - Bill Gairdner, track and field athlete
October 29 - Galen Weston, businessman
November 13 - Daniel Pilon, Canadian actor
November 20 - George Swede, poet and children's writer
November 29 - Denny Doherty, singer and songwriter (d. 2007)
December 20 - Ed Helwer, politician
December 29 - George Puce, discus thrower

Full date unknown
Christine Demeter, murder victim (d. 1973)
Stan Hagen, politician (d. 2009)
Dave Nichol, Loblaws products marketer (d. 2013)

Deaths

January to June
February 11 - John Buchan, 1st Baron Tweedsmuir, novelist, politician and 15th Governor General of Canada (b. 1875)
March 3 - Joseph Ovide Brouillard, politician and businessman (b. 1859)
March 26 - Richard Squires, politician and Prime Minister of Newfoundland (b. 1880)
April 25 - John Hampden Burnham, politician and lawyer (b. 1860)
May 2 - James Bowman, politician (b. 1861)
June 10 - Norman McLeod Rogers, lawyer, politician and Minister (b. 1894)

July to December
September 2 - Maude Abbott, physician (b. 1869)
September 7 - Laura Borden, wife of Robert Borden, 8th Prime Minister of Canada (b. 1862)
October 9 - Wilfred Grenfell, medical missionary (b. 1865)
October 10 - Berton Churchill, actor (b. 1876)
December 5 - Wilfred Lucas, actor, film director and screenwriter (b. 1871)

Historical documents
"The influence of the older generation" - Indian residential school principal sorry his pupils' "good training" neutralized at home

"Almost terrifying sums of money" - Transport Minister C.D. Howe on War Supply Board's huge task, and power

Training facilities across Canada will be set up to turn out 35,000 Commonwealth pilots, air gunners and observers annually

Infantry training at Toronto's Canadian National Exhibition grounds to supply reinforcements for units now in England

Limit to "complete equality for women" is on North Atlantic as female reporters tour Canadian destroyer at sea

CBC speeches by J.W. Dafoe, playwright Robert E. Sherwood, novelist James Hilton and columnist Dorothy Thompson on wartime "causes and issues"

Controversy erupts in Ontario Liberal Party over Premier Hepburn's "personal grudge" censure of King war policy

"My own bomb came looking for me, but I was not at home" - Canadian diplomat survives Blitz (just barely) in London

King George walks five miles and stops to chat 50 times as he inspects Canadian First Division in England

First loan drive (for 12-year bonds at 3.25% interest) brings in more than $136 million from cities, towns and hamlets

Nazi-linked German nationals and suspect German-Canadians to be interned as possibly dangerous to Canada

"No place for excitement in the hearts of people" regarding federal election issues, but deep concern over world affairs in Ottawa

Hours before its capitulation to Germans, Canadian, British and U.S. governments pledge help to imperilled France

Following fall of France, Quebec editorials call on English and French Canadian men to heed call to Canada's defence

Every Canadian resident (including aliens) 16 or over must comply with National Registration process and carry registration certificate at all times

Importance of British subject status and "race" (e.g., English, Scottish, French, Italian) in National Registration process

Montreal mayor interned as "prejudicial to the public safety" after he "blasted" wartime compulsory training order

Editorials point out importance of U.S.A. to Allies' struggle, and its people's recognition of that

Canada shifting main war partnership from Britain to U.S.A.; public wants greater war effort (except overseas conscription)

U.S. ambassador reports Canadian public demanding "some form of joint defence understanding with the United States"

U.S.A. and Canada set up Permanent Joint Board on Defence to protect North America

Leslie Gilbert Illingworth political cartoon of U.S.-Canada defence pact has Wild West setting

Supervisor of German sanitorium and Württemberg bishop object to unlawful killing of mental patients and epileptics

"Such a sudden and swift offensive" - Ukrainian-Canadian leftists are arrested in wide police sweep in Winnipeg

With government "forcing conscription of unemployed and needy youth," Canadian Youth Congress wants training and jobs

Liberal Party federal election leaflet identifies CCF (and Nazis) as socialist

German Jewish refugee Frederick Mendel turns Saskatoon meatpacking plant into thriving business

Anarchist Emma Goldman feels "gagged and paralyzed" in wartime Canada as she collects money for refugees

Black man becomes CPR sleeping car porter after being repeatedly rejected as machinist and told to shine shoes (Note: "nigger" used)

References 

 
Years of the 20th century in Canada
Canada
1940 in North America